The Köprü Dam is a gravity dam on the Göksu, the main tributary of the Seyhan River about  northwest of Kozan in Adana Province, Turkey. Its primary purpose is hydroelectric power generation. Construction began in 2009 and was complete in 2012. On 24 February 2012, the dam's diversion tunnel seal broke while the dam was impounding the river for the first time. The accident and subsequent flood killed 10 workers. Downstream communities received proper warning and no one was killed.

See also

Kavşak Bendi Dam – downstream on the Sehyan River
List of dams and reservoirs in Turkey
Dam failure

References

Dams in Adana Province
Hydroelectric power stations in Turkey
Dams completed in 2012
Gravity dams
Dam failures in Europe
2012 industrial disasters
Roller-compacted concrete dams
2012 disasters in Turkey